Rajive Bagrodia, Ph.D. is an Indian-American computer scientist and entrepreneur.  He is the Founder and Chief Technical Officer of Scalable Network Technologies as well as an emeritus professor of computer science at UCLA.

Education and research

Rajive Bagrodia received his Bachelor of Technology in electrical engineering from the Indian Institute of Technology Bombay, and his MA and Ph.D. in Computer Science from the University of Texas at Austin. As a Professor of Computer Science at UCLA, his areas of research included wireless networks, mobile computing & communications, network simulation & analysis, and parallel & distributed computing. He led a research team in mobile computing and parallel and distributed programming and developed simulations systems such as Maisie, Parsec, and GloMoSim. This research was funded by The Defense Advanced Research Projects Agency (DARPA) under the Design of Mobile Adaptive Networks Using Simulation and Agent Technology(DOMAINS) project at UCLA. Given these results in performance prediction for complex, large-scale computer and communication systems, he founded Scalable Network Technologies in 1999.

Dr. Bagrodia has continued to conduct a prolific amount of research. He has published over 150 research papers in Computer Science journals and spoken at international conferences on high performance computing, wireless networking, and parallel simulation. He has also provided commentary on issues relating to cyberwarfare and warfighter training.

Scalable Network Technologies

Scalable Network Technologies is headquartered in Los, Angeles California but has partnered with Analytical Graphics, Presagis, and VT MAK as well as technology resellers in China, France, United Kingdom, India, Israel, Japan, Korea, and Taiwan.

The company develops high-performance communications simulation software to test the reliability and resiliency of networks in rapidly changing environments, design new communications technology, enable virtual systems test before significant physical investment, and train network architects on the effective design of dynamic multi-vendor communications systems. More recently, the company has made a transition to cyber defense training, launching its newest product to train all types of users how to navigate cyber attacks. The company emphasizes its mixed model in which it integrates virtual network models with live physical hardware in all of its products.

References

UCLA Henry Samueli School of Engineering and Applied Science faculty
IIT Bombay alumni
American computer scientists
Living people
Year of birth missing (living people)